Donna Hughes is an Americana country bluegrass singer, songwriter, guitarist, pianist, and animal rights activist. She has released several albums on Rounder Records and one of her songs has been recorded by Alison Krauss. Her second album, Gaining Wisdom (2007), was produced by bluegrass guitar legend Tony Rice and third album (2010) by the legendary banjo performer J.D. Crowe. In August 2014, Donna Hughes produced and released two albums on her own label Running Dog Records: From The Heart, where she wrote 19 of the 21 tracks and a piano album. Fly, writing 8 of the 12 tracks.

External links
 Official site
 
 "Donna Hughes, Bluegrass Musician, Dogs' Best Friend!" by Staff, WNC Times, February 19, 2015. 
 "Randolph singer/songwriter Donna Hughes targets dogs on chains (+video)" by Chip Womick, The Courier Tribune, February 7, 2015.
 "Hughes to release piano, bluegrass albums" by Staff, The Courier-Tribune, May 2, 2014
 "Bluegrass singer Donna Hughes coming to Mountaineer Opry House" by Derek Halsey, The Herald-Dispatch, September 4, 2008.

Living people
American bluegrass guitarists
American country singer-songwriters
American women country singers
American women guitarists
People from Trinity, North Carolina
Year of birth missing (living people)
Singer-songwriters from North Carolina
Women bluegrass guitarists
Guitarists from North Carolina
Country musicians from North Carolina
21st-century American women singers
21st-century American singers